The Barkas B 1000 is a forward control panel van made by the East German manufacturer VEB Barkas-Werke in Chemnitz (formerly known as Karl-Marx-Stadt). It was made in several different body styles: as a panel van, minibus seating eight, and pickup truck. Special-purpose vehicles based on the Barkas B 1000 were made as well. In June 1961, the production of the four-door panel van commenced, with the minibus following in spring 1964, and the pickup truck in spring 1965. With its payload of 1,000 kg, and its spacious interior, the Barkas B 1000 proved to be very durable and reliable. During its 27-year production period, it received some minor updates in 1963 and 1972, but all efforts to develop a successor failed, and there were no major design alterations for the remainder of its production. The successor Barkas B 1000-1, introduced in autumn 1989, carried over the technical design, but it was fitted with a different engine. In 1990, manufacture was sold to a Russian company, but production never was restarted.

Technical description 

The Barkas B 1000 is a two-axle vehicle with a front-mounted engine and front-wheel drive. From the factory, it has a wheelbase of 2,400 mm. The chassis of the Barkas depends on its body type: panel vans and minibuses have a semi-self-supporting body mounted on a box frame, whilst pickup trucks and special vehicles have a U-section frame. The independent suspension of the Barkas is very unusual, it has diagonal link rear and front suspension with torsion bars and hydraulic shock absorbers. All wheels have brake drums that are hydraulically operated. The engine is a three-cylinder, liquid-cooled, carburetted, two-stroke engine, mounted between driver seat and passenger seat in front of the front axle; it is paired with a synchromesh four-speed gearbox. Depending on the vehicle configuration, the Barkas can reach a top speed of either 95 km/h or 100 km/h.

Updates 

1963: The single-circuit brake system was upgraded to a dual-circuit brake system, and the column shifter was replaced with a regular central shift lever.
1972: The 220 W alternator was replaced with a 500 W alternator, and the engine power output was increased from 31 kW to 33 kW.

Gallery

Bibliography 

Werner Oswald: Kraftfahrzeuge der DDR. 2nd edition. Motorbuch-Verlag, Stuttgart 2000, p. 199–205

References 

Minibuses
Vans
Minivans
Pickup trucks
Cab over vehicles
1960s cars
1970s cars
1980s cars
Cars introduced in 1961
IFA vehicles